Leucine responsive protein, or Lrp, is a global regulator protein, meaning that it regulates the biosynthesis of leucine, as well as the other branched-chain amino acids, valine and isoleucine. In bacteria, it is encoded by the lrp gene.

Lrp alternatively activates and represses the expression of acetolactate synthase's (ALS) several isoenzymes. Lrp, in E. coli, along with DAM plays a role in the regulation of the fim operon, a group of genes needed for successful synthesis and trafficking of Type I Pili. These hair like structures are important virulence factors for different pathogenic strains of Bacteria as they can mediate biofilm formation and adhesion to host epithelia. Other examples include Salmonella enterica serovar Typhimurium and Klebsiella pneumoniae.

More generally, Lrp facilitates the proliferation and pathogenesis of bacteria in their hosts.

References

External links
 

Proteins